Perilitus is a genus of wasps.

References

Braconidae genera